Opus 100 is a collection by American writer and scientist Isaac Asimov.  It was published by Houghton Mifflin on 16 October 1969.  Asimov chose to celebrate the publication of his hundredth book by writing about his previous 99 books, including excerpts from short stories and novels, as well as nonfiction articles and books.  Opus 100 also includes five complete science fiction stories and one complete science essay.

Contents
Introduction

Part 1. Astronomy
Excerpt from "The Callistan Menace"
Excerpt from Lucky Starr and the Moons of Jupiter
Excerpt from "View from Amalthea" from The Solar System and Back
Excerpt from Lucky Starr and the Oceans of Venus
Excerpt from "The Martian Way"
Excerpt from The Universe
Excerpt from Galaxies
Part 2. Robots
Excerpt from "The Perfect Machine" from Today and Tomorrow and ...
Excerpt from "Strange Playfellow" (usually titled "Robbie")
Excerpt from "Liar!"
Excerpt from "Runaround"
Excerpt from "I, Robot"
Excerpt from The Intelligent Man's Guide to Science
"The Last Question"
Part 3. Mathematics
Excerpt from Realm of Numbers
Excerpt from Quick and Easy Math
"The Feeling of Power"
Part 4. Physics
Excerpt from Asimov's Biographical Encyclopedia of Science and Technology
Excerpt from the introduction to Only a Trillion
Excerpt from The Neutrino
Excerpt from "Superneutron"
Part 5. Chemistry
Excerpt from "The Sound of Panting" from Only a Trillion
Excerpt from Biochemistry and Human Metabolism
Excerpt from The Chemicals of Life
Excerpt from The Noble Gases
"Thiotimoline and the Space Age"
Excerpt from The Kinetics of the Reaction Inactivation of Tyrosinase during its Catalysis of the Aerobic Oxidation of Catechol (his PhD thesis)
Part 6. Biology
Excerpt from The Wellsprings of Life
Excerpt from Photosynthesis
Part 7. Words
Excerpts from Words of Science
"Helium"
"Idiot"
"RH Negative"
Excerpts from Words on the Map
"New Jersey"
"Philadelphia"
"Virgin Islands"
Excerpts from Words from History
"Bloody Shirt"
"Mob"
"Potemkin Village"
Part 8. History
Excerpt from The Greeks
"The Spartan Way of Life"
Excerpt from The Roman Republic
Excerpt from The Egyptians
Excerpt from The Near East
Excerpt from "There's Nothing Like a Good Foundation" from Asimov on Science Fiction
Excerpt from "The Dead Hand"
Part 9. The Bible
Excerpt from Asimov's Guide to the Bible
"Twelve Point Three Six Nine" from Science, Numbers, and I
Part 10. Short Shorts
Excerpt from Please Explain
"On Prediction", an introduction to Future Tense edited by Richard Curtis
"An Uncompromising View", a review of Mechanical Men by Dean E. Wooldridge
"Dreamworld"
Part 11. Humor
"The Holmes-Ginsbook Device"
Appendix: My Hundred Books

Reception
Algis Budrys gave Opus 100 a mixed review, saying "the book as a whole demands so many shifts of personality and attitude in the reader that no one, not even Asimov, could keep up with them comfortably."

See also
Opus 200
Opus 300

References

External links

Books by Isaac Asimov
1969 books
Houghton Mifflin books